While America Sleeps is a book by historians Donald Kagan and Frederick Kagan, published September 2000.  Their thesis was that the United States at the end of the Cold War resembled the United Kingdom following World War I. They argue for a policy of strengthening U.S. defense and a willingness to use force.  Michael Lind has argued that the book contributed to neoconservative thought in U.S. foreign policy.

Title
Two similarly titled works were published around the time of World War II: While England Slept (1938), by future British Prime Minister Winston Churchill, and Why England Slept (1940), by future U.S. President John F. Kennedy, at the time a Harvard University undergraduate student.

Bibliography 
Kagan, Donald and Frederick W. Kagan. While America Sleeps: Self-Delusion, Military Weakness, and the Threat to Peace Today. St. Martin's Press: September 2000. 

Political books
2000 non-fiction books